1952 Olympics refers to both:

The 1952 Winter Olympics, which were held in Oslo, Norway
The 1952 Summer Olympics, which were held in Helsinki, Finland